The House of Palatinate-Zweibrücken, a branch of the Wittelsbach dynasty, was the ruling dynasty of Sweden from 1654 to 1720.

By this point it had splintered into several different houses. The Royal House of Sweden was represented by the branch Palatinate-Zweibrücken-Kleeburg.

The ancestor of the House of Palatinate-Zweibrücken was Stephen, Count Palatine of Simmern-Zweibrücken (1385–1459), a son of King Rupert of Germany.

Family tree

Cadet branches 
Some cadet branches are:
 House of Palatinate-Kleeburg
 House of Palatinate-Veldenz
 House of Palatinate-Neuburg
 House of Palatinate-Sulzbach
 House of Palatinate-Birkenfeld
 House of Carlson (Illegitimate)

See also
 Palatine Zweibrücken#List of Counts Palatine Zweibrücken

External links

|-